The World Armwrestling Federation (WAF) is an international federation of national and regional arm wrestling associations. Currently, WAF has members from 82 countries.

WAF members

World Armwrestling Championships

World Armwrestling Federation (WAF) is the international governing organization for the sport of arm wrestling, established in 1977. WAF is WADA Code Compliant. The WAF is the main organizer of the World Armwrestling Championships, which is held every year. Official programme has 36 events for senior athletes.

References

External links

 

Arm wrestling organizations
Sports organizations established in 1977
International sports organizations
Martial arts organizations